The year 2008 was the 227th year of the Rattanakosin Kingdom of Thailand. It was the 63rd year in the reign of King Bhumibol Adulyadej (Rama IX), and is reckoned as year 2551 in the Buddhist Era. Much of the year was spent under the 2008 Thai political crisis, which saw political protests leading to the dissolution of the ruling People's Power Party by the Constitutional Court.

Incumbents
King: Bhumibol Adulyadej 
Crown Prince: Vajiralongkorn
Prime Minister: 
 until 29 January: Surayud Chulanont
 29 January-8 September: Samak Sundaravej 
 18 September-2 December: Somchai Wongsawat 
 2 December-15 December: Chaovarat Chanweerakul (acting)
 starting 17 December: Abhisit Vejjajiva
Supreme Patriarch: Nyanasamvara Suvaddhana

Events

January
2008 ASEAN ParaGames took place from January 20 to 26.

February

March
2008 Thai Senate election took place on March 2.

April
Ranong human-trafficking incident took place on April 8. There were 54 reported deaths.

May

June

July

August

September

October
2008 Bangkok gubernatorial election was held on October 5. Incumbent Governor Apirak Kosayothin won the election.

November

December

Births

Deaths

See also
 2008 Thai political crisis
 2008 Thailand national football team results
 2008 Thailand National Games
 2008 in Thai television
 List of Thai films of 2008

References

External links
Year 2008 Calendar - Thailand

 
Years of the 21st century in Thailand
Thailand